Michel Chodkiewicz (13 May 1929 – 31 March 2020) was a French author and a scholar of Sufism, especially Akbarian teaching.

Biography 
Chodkiewicz was from the Chodkiewicz family, a noble family of the Polish aristocracy who settled in France in 1832. He was born in Paris in 1929 and completed most of his education there. He was Director-General then President and CEO of Editions du Seuil from 1977 to 1989. He became director of studies at the Ecole des Hautes Etudes en Sciences Sociales where he conducted seminars on Ibn 'Arabi.

He converted to Islam as the "outcome of a personal search begun as a teenager [...] because Catholicism did not provide satisfactory answers". During a trip to the Arab countries, he discovered Sufism and converted to Islam around the age of seventeen. His daughter is Claude Addas.

Main publications 
 Émir Abd el-Kader, Écrits spirituels, presentation, translation and notes, Seuil, 1982 ; reprint 1994.
 Awhad al-Din Balyani, Épître sur l'Unicité absolue, presentation, translation and notes, Les Deux Océans, 1982.
 Le Sceau des Saints, Prophétie et Sainteté dans la doctrine d'Ibn 'Arabî, Éditions Gallimard, 1986; reprint 2012.
 Ibn 'Arabî, Les Illuminations de La Mecque, texts chosen from al-Futûhât al-Makkîya (in collaboration with W.C. Chittick, C. Chodkiewicz, D. Gril and J.W. Morris), Sindbad, 1988; reprint with subtitle Anthologie présentée par Michel Chodkiewicz, Albin Michel/Spiritualités vivantes, 2008.
 Un Océan sans rivage. Ibn 'Arabî, le Livre et la Loi, Éditions du Seuil, 1992.

Bibliography 
Chodkiewicz's books were written in French. Below are some of his books that have been translated into English.
 The Spiritual Writings of Amir 'Abd al-Kader (1982). 
 The Seal of the Saints: Prophethood and Sainthood in the Doctrine of Ibn Arabi (1986).
 Ibn 'Arabî: The Meccan Revelations (translation of selected chapters, 1988)
 An Ocean Without Shore: Ibn Arabi, the Book, and the Law (1992)

References

See also
 Michel Chodkiewicz 1929–2020 at The Muhyiddin Ibn ‘Arabi Society (MIAS).

1929 births
2020 deaths
French chief executives
Chief executives in the publishing industry
French people of Polish descent
French Muslims
French scholars of Islam
French Sufis
Scholars of Sufism
Ibn Arabi scholars
Traditionalist School
Muslim scholars of Islamic studies